Pardaleodes bule is a butterfly in the family Hesperiidae. It is found in Cameroon, Bioko, the Republic of the Congo, the Democratic Republic of the Congo, Uganda, western Kenya and western Tanzania. The habitat consists of open spaces in lowland evergreen forests at altitudes between 800 and 1,000 meters.

References

Butterflies described in 1896
Erionotini
Butterflies of Africa